is a Japanese women's professional shogi player ranked 2-dan.

Women's shogi professional

Promotion history
Murata's promotion history is as follows:
 2-kyū: October 1, 2005
 1: 1-kyū: April 1, 2006
 1-dan: April 1, 2008
 2-dan: September 10, 2014

Note: All ranks are women's professional ranks.

Professional Shogi Players Group

Personal life
Murota married professional go player Yūta Iyama in 2012, but the couple divorced in 2015.

References

External links
 ShogiHub: Murota, Io

Japanese shogi players
Living people
Women's professional shogi players
Professional shogi players from Aichi Prefecture
People from Kasugai, Aichi
1989 births